{{Infobox settlement
| name                     = 
| image_skyline            = AguinaldoShrinejf0944 13.JPG
| image_caption            = Aguinaldo Shrine
| image_flag               = Flag_of_Kawit,_Cavite.png
| flag_size                = 120x80px
| image_seal               = Ph_seal_cavite_kawit.png
| seal_size                = 100x80px
| image_map                = 
| map_caption              = 
| image_map1               = 
| pushpin_map              = Philippines
| pushpin_label_position   = left
| pushpin_map_caption      = Location within the 
| coordinates              = 
| settlement_type          = 
| subdivision_type         = Country
| subdivision_name         = Philippines
| subdivision_type1        = Region
| subdivision_name1        = 
| subdivision_type2        = Province
| subdivision_name2        = 
| official_name            = 
| etymology                = 
| named_for                = 
| native_name              = 
| other_name               = Cavite el Viejo
| nickname                 = Site of the Declaration of Independence
| motto                    = Alab ng Puso| anthem                   = 
| subdivision_type3        = District
| subdivision_name3        = 
| established_title        = Founded
| established_date         = 1898
| parts_type               = Barangays
| parts_style              = para
| p1                       =   (see Barangays)
| leader_title             =  
| leader_name              = Angelo Emilio G. Aguinaldo 
| leader_title1            = Vice Mayor
| leader_name1             = Edward R. Samala Jr.
| leader_title2            = Representative 
| leader_name2             = Ramon Revilla III
| leader_title3            = Municipal Council
| leader_name3             = 
| leader_title4            = Electorate
| leader_name4             =  voters
| government_type          = 
| government_footnotes     = 
| elevation_m              = 
| elevation_max_m          = 47
| elevation_min_m          = 0
| elevation_max_rank       = 
| elevation_min_rank       = 
| elevation_footnotes      = 
| elevation_max_footnotes  = 
| elevation_min_footnotes  = 
| area_rank                = 
| area_footnotes           = 
| area_total_km2           = 
| population_footnotes     = 
| population_total         = 
| population_as_of         = 
| population_density_km2   = auto
| population_blank1_title  = Households
| population_blank1        = 
| population_blank2_title  = 
| population_blank2        = 
| population_demonym       = Kawiteño
| population_rank          = 
| population_note          = 
| timezone                 = PST
| utc_offset               = +8
| postal_code_type         = ZIP code
| postal_code              = 
| postal2_code_type        = 
| postal2_code             = 
| area_code_type           = 
| area_code                = 
| website                  = 
| demographics_type1       = Economy
| demographics1_title1     = 
| demographics1_info1      = 
| demographics1_title2     = Poverty incidence
| demographics1_info2      = %
| demographics1_title3     = Revenue
| demographics1_info3      =  
| demographics1_title4     = Revenue rank
| demographics1_info4      = 
| demographics1_title5     = Assets
| demographics1_info5      =  
| demographics1_title6     = Assets rank
| demographics1_info6      = 
| demographics1_title7     = IRA
| demographics1_info7      = 
| demographics1_title8     = IRA rank
| demographics1_info8      = 
| demographics1_title9     = Expenditure
| demographics1_info9      =  
| demographics1_title10    = Liabilities
| demographics1_info10     =  
| demographics_type2       = Service provider
| demographics2_title1     = Electricity
| demographics2_info1      = 
| demographics2_title2     = Water
| demographics2_info2      = 
| demographics2_title3     = Telecommunications
| demographics2_info3      = 
| demographics2_title4     = Cable TV
| demographics2_info4      = 
| demographics2_title5     = 
| demographics2_info5      = 
| demographics2_title6     = 
| demographics2_info6      = 
| demographics2_title7     = 
| demographics2_info7      = 
| demographics2_title8     = 
| demographics2_info8      = 
| demographics2_title9     = 
| demographics2_info9      = 
| demographics2_title10    = 
| demographics2_info10     = 
| blank_name_sec1          = 
| blank_info_sec1          = 
| blank1_name_sec1         = Native languages
| blank1_info_sec1         = Tagalog and Chavacano Caviteño
| blank2_name_sec1         = Crime index
| blank2_info_sec1         = 
| blank3_name_sec1         = 
| blank3_info_sec1         = 
| blank4_name_sec1         = 
| blank4_info_sec1         = 
| blank5_name_sec1         = 
| blank5_info_sec1         = 
| blank6_name_sec1         = 
| blank6_info_sec1         = 
| blank7_name_sec1         = 
| blank7_info_sec1         = 
| blank1_name_sec2         = Major religions
| blank1_info_sec2         = 
| blank2_name_sec2         = Feast date
| blank2_info_sec2         = 
| blank3_name_sec2         = Catholic diocese
| blank3_info_sec2         = 
| blank4_name_sec2         = Patron saint
| blank4_info_sec2         = 
| blank5_name_sec2         = 
| blank5_info_sec2         = 
| blank6_name_sec2         = 
| blank6_info_sec2         = 
| blank7_name_sec2         = 
| blank7_info_sec2         = 
| short_description        = 
| footnotes                = 
}}

Kawit, officially the Municipality of Kawit,  is a first-class municipality in the province of Cavite, Philippines. According to the 2020 census, it has a population of 107,535. It is one of the notable places that had a major role in the country's history during the 1800s and 1900s.

Formerly known as  Cavite el Viejo, it is the location of his home, and the name Kawit is from the word kalawit, the Aguinaldo Shrine, where independence from Spain was declared on June 12, 1898. It is also the birthplace of Emilio Aguinaldo, the first president of the Philippines, who from 1895 to 1897, served as the municipality's chief executive.

Etymology
The name Kawit is derived from the Tagalog word kawit  kalawit  (hook), which is suggestive of its location at the base of a hook-shaped shoreline along Manila Bay extending to the tip of Cavite City.

Legend, however, gives another version on how the town got its name. One day, a Spanish visitor asked a native blacksmith about the name of the village. The latter was busy at the time pounding on the anvil a piece of hot metal that looked like a hook. He hesitated to speak, not understanding what the stranger was asking, but when pressed for an answer, and thinking that he wanted to know what he was doing, he merely said kawit. The Spanish left muttering the word kawit. In the course of the time, the word evolved into cauite, and finally cavite.

History
Kawit was the most thriving settlement prior to the coming of the Spanish. In fact, the town provided the first anchorage of the Spanish in the province, whence colonization and proselytization of the Christian religion began, spreading to all corners of the province.

For a long time, the place was called by the Spanish "Cavite el Viejo" or Old Cavite to distinguish it from "Cavite la Punta" or "Cavite el Puerto", the commercial port and naval base (now Cavite City) whence came many Spanish marines on shore leave who made frequent visits to Cavite el Viejo, eventually turning it into a red-light district. This seedy reputation of the town was erased when Saint Mary Magdalene was made patroness, under the spiritual supervision of the Jesuits as ordered by Miguel García Serrano, O.S.A. (1618–1629), the fifth Archbishop of Manila.

With the establishment in the wake of the Philippine Revolution, the Philippine Independent Church built a shrine to Saint Michael, the Archangel in the barrio of Binakayan in 1902.

Cavite el Viejo was then a big town, comprising the municipality of Kawit today, Cavite la Punta (now Cavite City), Noveleta (called Tierra Alta by the Spanish), and Imus. Eventually, these three barrios' populations grew and they eventually seceded to become independent municipalities.

Aside from its role as the birthplace of independence, Kawit was also the site of the Battle of Binakayan-Dalahican, one of several Filipino victories during the Revolution.

Geography
Barangays
Kawit is politically subdivided into 23 barangays.

Climate

Demographics

 Economy 

Culture

 Maytinis Festival 
An original Kawit tradition that takes place every Christmas Eve, a dramatic retelling of the Virgin Mary and Joseph's search in Bethlehem for a place to stay called "Panunuluyan". This reenactment happens on the streets of Kawit with different floats depicting different biblical scenes from Adam and Eve up to Mary and Joseph. The "Panunuluyan" takes place in several houses and is done in singing until it reaches the 400-year-old St. Mary Magdalene Church, where the Virgin Mary and Joseph are welcomed by angels in a giant belen (Nativity Scene), which covers the whole main Retablo or altarpiece of the church. The songs performed by the angels acted by little girls are mostly in Spanish and Tagalog.

Government
Like any other Philippine municipality, Kawit is headed by a municipal mayor, vice mayor, and 10 councilors, eight of them elected at large by the voting populace and two of them being sectoral representatives (one for the barangays'' and one for the youth, elected respectively through their federations).

The current mayor of the historical town is Angelo Emilio G. Aguinaldo, who succeeded his father, Reynaldo "Tik" Aguinaldo, after winning over former Vice Mayor Paul Plaridel A. Abaya Jr. by a historic margin of 5,039 votes in the last May 2016 elections.

Mayor Angelo Aguinaldo served as a Sangguniang Bayan member from 2013 to 2016.

Then Mayor Reynaldo "Tik" Aguinaldo was elevated to the mayorship after three terms as vice mayor.  The scion of the first Philippine president has twice (2007 and 2010) beaten Federico "Hit" Poblete, another descendant of Emilio Aguinaldo (youngest son of Maria Aguinaldo y Poblete: one of General Emilio Aguinaldo's daughters), Poblete served a total of five terms as its chief executive. He used to be an undersecretary for the Department of Agrarian Reform under the Estrada administration after his first three terms as mayor (1988–1998).

Sister city
  Sakegawa, Yamagata, Japan

See also
Aguinaldo Shrine
St.Michael the Archangel Parish of Binakayan (Aglipayan Church)
St. Mary Magdalene Church of Kawit
Baldomero Aguinaldo Shrine
Battle of Binakayan-Dalahican
 Kawit revolt, 1896
 Kawit shooting, 2013

Images

References

External links

Official Website of the Provincial Government of Cavite
[ Philippine Standard Geographic Code]
Philippine Census Information

 
Municipalities of Cavite
Populated places on Manila Bay